The New England Fifty Finest is a list of mountains in New England, used in the mountaineering sport of peak bagging. The list comprises the 50 summits with the highest topographic prominence — a peak's height above the lowest contour which encloses that peak and no higher peak. The list includes 20 peaks in Maine, 15 in Vermont, 14 in New Hampshire, and one in Massachusetts.

This list differs substantially from lists of peaks by elevation, such as the New England 4000 Footers.  For instance, only one peak in the Presidential Range is on this list because the others do not have a major prominence, being connected to Mount Washington by ridgelines that are nowhere below . Mount Washington has an elevation above sea level of  but has a prominence of about  because it stands that high above its key col — the lowest ground on the ridge line connecting Washington to the higher peaks of the southern Appalachian Mountains.  Washington's key col is at the Champlain Canal in New York, the lowest ground on the water divide between the watersheds of the Hudson and Saint Lawrence Rivers.  

Of the 48 New Hampshire Four-thousand Footers, only eight are also on this list, including Mount Lafayette and Carter Dome, which are the high points of the Franconia Range and the Carter-Moriah Range, respectively. The list includes several monadnocks, including the eponymous Mount Monadnock, and the high points of several small mountain ranges which have high prominence by virtue of their isolation from higher peaks by surrounding low ground.

List

Notes

See also 
 Adirondack High Peaks (the Forty-sixers)
 Four-thousand footers of New Hampshire
 List of New England Hundred Highest
 List of Quebec 1000 meter peaks
 Northeast 111, all 4000-footers of the Northeastern United States

External links 

 Most Prominent Peaks in New England, compiled by Roy Schweiker and Andy Martin 
 PeakBagger.com: New England Top 50 by Prominence 
 Map: "Northeastern US Mountains (New York and New England) Showing Peaks with 2,000 Feet of Prominence" by Aaron Maizlish, (2003).

Lists of mountains of the United States
Lists of mountains by prominence
Lists of mountains of the Appalachians